Montecasino, popularly shortened to Monte, is a leisure and casino complex in Fourways, Sandton in Gauteng, South Africa. It was designed by American company Creative Kingdom Inc. and built by South African architects Bentel Associates International at a cost of R1.6 billion. It first opened its doors on 30 November 2000 and it currently attracts over 9.3 million visitors annually. It is themed after Monte Cassino . It has been designed to replicate an ancient Tuscan village. The main casino building has a fake sky, painted on the ceiling, inside going from light on one side to dark at the other.

Montecasino is owned by Tsogo Sun. Tsogo Sun is a partnership between Southern Sun and Tsogo Investments. Tsogo Investments is a black empowerment group and the hotel component of Tsogo Sun's casinos are developed and managed by Southern Sun. Tsogo Sun holds the casino license for Montecasino.

Teatro

The Teatro opened its doors in May 2007. The Teatro was constructed at a cost of over R100 million and is one of the 10 largest Lyric theatres in the world. The Teatro is currently the largest theatre in South Africa and can sit 1,870 people at full capacity. The Teatro theatre has hosted major musical productions such as the Disney Broadway musical The Lion King in 2007 as well as Joyous Celebration Rewind Recordings.

See also 

 Fourways Mall
 Sandton City

References

External links
Montecasino 
Tsogo Sun
Montecasino Fact Sheet
The Palazzo Montecasino

2000 establishments in South Africa
Casinos completed in 2000
Buildings and structures in Johannesburg
Tourist attractions in Johannesburg
Casinos in South Africa
21st-century architecture in South Africa